The 2000 Asian Taekwondo Championships are the 14th edition of the Asian Taekwondo Championships, and were held in Hong Kong from May 13 to May 16, 2000.

South Korea dominated the competition, winning 13 gold medals.

Medal summary

Men

Women

Medal table

References
 Results

External links
WT Official Website

Asian Championships
Asian Taekwondo Championships
Asian Taekwondo Championships
Taekwondo Championships